Luv Kumar Goldy is a two-time MLA of the Punjab Legislative Assembly for the Garhshankar Assembly Constituency in Punjab, India. He was defeated by Jai Krishan Singh in the 2017 Punjab assembly elections and by Surinder Singh Bhulewal Rathan in 2012. He stood third in 2017 elections.

Recently ahead of 2022 Punjab Legislative Assembly Election he joined PLC of former CM of Punjab Captain Amarinder Singh.

Election results

2017

References 

Living people
Punjab, India MLAs 2002–2007
Punjab, India MLAs 2007–2012
Punjab, India MLAs 2012–2017
People from Hoshiarpur district
Indian National Congress politicians from Punjab, India
Year of birth missing (living people)